Critical Path is a provider of messaging services, working in partnerships with mobile operators, telecommunications companies, ISPs, and enterprises. It was acquired on December 4, 2013, by  Openwave Messaging and is now headed by Open-wave Messaging President and CEO, Joe Campbell. On March 2, 2016, it was announced that Synchronoss Technologies agreed to acquire Openwave Messaging.

History
Critical Path, Inc. was founded in 1997 by David C. Hayden and Wayne de Geere III as a provider of outsourced email service to ISPs. In 1998 they hired a new CEO, Doug Hickey and acquired Usenet provider Supernews. The company went public on March 29, 1999. The IPO was covered favorably by the trade press at the time. In early 2001, nearly two years after their IPO, a series of lawsuits against Critical Path were filed over hiring practices, accounting irregularities, and securities fraud, culminating in a management shakeup and SEC action against the company's President, David Thatcher, and other executives. Thatcher and two others pleaded guilty and were sentenced to jail terms from three months to one year. In 2005 their stock was delisted by Nasdaq.

In 2007 the company went private and in 2008 sold Supernews to Giganews.

In October 2010, Critical Path and Mirapoint, a secure enterprise messaging company, announced their decision to merge.

See also
 Internet messaging platform
 List of antivirus software
 Integration of anti-spam techniques into MTAs

References

Companies established in 1997